The Association for Core Texts and Courses (ACTC) is a global association of colleges and universities supporting the use of classic texts and core curricula in undergraduate education.  It is headquartered at Saint Mary's College of California. It is broadly associated with general education.

Members range from tiny institutions with a single curriculum, such as Deep Springs College (26 students), to large universities like Columbia University that offer a core curriculum or dedicated Great Books program.  Although the majority of member institutions are in the United States, the ACTC also has member institutions in Canada, China, Guatemala, and Iraq.

The ACTC was organized in the course of the 1994-1995 academic year, and held its first conference in 1995.

Member institutions

As of the 2014-2015 academic year, the ACTC has upwards of 60 institutional members:

American University in Iraq
Assumption College
Austin College
Baylor University
Benedictine University
Boston College
Boston University
Carleton University (Canada)
Carthage College
Chinese University of Hong Kong
College of Mount Saint Vincent
Colgate University
Columbia University
Concordia University—Liberal Arts College (Canada)
Concordia University, Irvine
Deep Springs College
Fresno Pacific University
Hillsdale College
James Madison University
Kansas State University
Lewis and Clark College
Longwood University
Luther College
Lüneburg University
Lynchburg College
Messiah College
Midwestern State University
Monterey Peninsula College Foundation
New York University
Norfolk State University
North Carolina Agricultural and Technical State University
Oglethorpe University
Orange Coast College
Oxford College of Emory University
Pepperdine University
Rhodes College
Saint Anselm College
Saint Bonaventure University
Saint Mary’s College of California
Saint Michael’s College
Samford University
Seton Hall University
Shimer College
St. John's College (Annapolis/Santa Fe)
St. Olaf College
St. Thomas University (New Brunswick)
Stockton University
Stonehill College
Sun Yat-sen University—Boya College
Universidad Francisco Marroquin
The College of New Jersey
Tulane University
University of Chicago
University of Dallas
University of King's College
University of Nebraska
University of Notre Dame — Program of Liberal Studies & First Year Studies
University of Virginia at Wise
Valparaiso University
Vancouver Island University
Villanova University
Yale University

References

External links
Official site

Great Books
Liberal arts education
University associations and consortia
Saint Mary's College of California